Diane Prince is a female former rower who competed for England.

Rowing career
Prince was part of the double sculls with Claire Parker, that won the national title rowing for a Birmingham University and Pengwern composite, at the 1986 National Championships. This led to her representing England and winning a bronze medal in the doubles sculls with Claire Parker, at the 1986 Commonwealth Games in Edinburgh, Scotland.

References

English female rowers
Commonwealth Games medallists in rowing
Commonwealth Games bronze medallists for England
Rowers at the 1986 Commonwealth Games
Medallists at the 1986 Commonwealth Games